Clyde Elmer Johnson (August 22, 1917 – September 14, 1997) was an American football player. He played college football for the Kentucky Wildcats football team and was selected by the Associated Press as a first-team tackle on the 1942 College Football All-America Team. He was Kentucky's first All-American football player.  At six feet, six inches, and 269 pounds, he was one of the largest football players of his day.  He was drafted by the Cleveland Rams with the 35th pick in the 1943 NFL Draft, but his professional debut was delayed during World War II.  After the war, he played in the National Football League (NFL) for the Rams in 1946 and 1947 and for the Los Angeles Dons in 1948. He died in 1997 in Orange County, California, at age 80.

References

1917 births
1997 deaths
Kentucky Wildcats football players
Cleveland Rams players
Los Angeles Dons players
American football tackles
Players of American football from Kentucky
People from Ashland, Kentucky